Mirrors is the second studio album by German pop singer Sandra, released on 13 October 1986 by Virgin Records. The album spawned the European Top 10 singles "Innocent Love" and "Hi! Hi! Hi!".

Background
Mirrors was produced by Michael Cretu and Armand Volker, and continued the synth-pop-oriented style introduced on Sandra's debut album, The Long Play, released the year before. The material was arranged with the use of such synthesizers as Akai S900, PPG, Linn 9000, Prophet 2002, Oberheim Matrix-12, EMS Vocoder, Yamaha DX7 and Roland Super Jupiter. Mirrors saw more songwriting and singing involvement from Hubert Kemmler, who was already a popular singer in Germany under the name of Hubert Kah. The song "Don't Cry (The Breakup of the World)" was written in reaction to the 1986 Chernobyl disaster.

Four singles were released from this album. "Innocent Love" was the lead single and reached the top 10 in multiple European countries, followed by "Hi! Hi! Hi!", which was a top-10 entry in Sandra's native Germany, as well as Greece and Spain. The ballad "Loreen" and the uptempo "Midnight Man" served as the album's third and fourth singles, respectively, and both achieved a moderate success across Europe.

The album charted within the top 20 in Germany, Switzerland, Finland and Norway.

Track listing

Personnel
Credits adapted from the liner notes of Mirrors.

 Sandra – lead vocals
 Michael Cretu – production, arrangements, performance, background vocals
 Armand Volker – production
 Hubert Kemmler – background vocals
 Peter Ries – background vocals
 Tissy Thiers – background vocals
 Timothy Touchton – voice on "The Second Day"
 Mike Schmidt – cover
 Dieter Eikelpoth – photography

Charts

Certifications

References

External links
 

1986 albums
Albums produced by Michael Cretu
Sandra (singer) albums
Virgin Records albums